Mount Massell is a mountain,  high, standing  southeast of Mount Jackman, in the Freyberg Mountains of Antarctica. It was mapped by the United States Geological Survey from surveys and U.S. Navy air photos, 1960–64, and was named by the Advisory Committee on Antarctic Names for Wulf Massell, Biolab Manager at McMurdo Station in 1967.

References

Mountains of Victoria Land
Pennell Coast